Faridul Haq Ansari (1 July 1895 – 4 April 1966), Popularly Farid Ansari, was a lawyer and politician who actively participated in Indian independence movement. He was a prominent socialist leader who got special mention in Jayprakash Narayan's writings. He served two terms as Member of Parliament in Rajya Sabha.

Early life
Faridul Haq Ansari was born in 1895 in Yusufpur town of Ghazipur district of Uttar Pradesh. His father Nezamul Haq Ansari was a zamindar. Faridul Haq got his education at St. Stephen's College, Delhi, Aligarh Muslim University and Oxford University. After returning to India he started practicing as lawyer at Delhi High Court in 1925. He joined Indian National Congress in 1927 and served as the Secretary of Delhi Pradesh Congress Committee. He was cousin of former president of Indian National Congress Mukhtar Ahmed Ansari.

Career
Faridul Haq actively participated in Indian independence movement and got arrested many times. He was one of the prominent leader of Quit India Movement who was sent to jail during 1942–1945. As a barrister he pleaded the defense in Meerut Conspiracy Case Trail (1929–33) along with Jawahar Lal Nehru and Kailash Nath Katju as a member of Central defence Committee setup by the Congress Working Committee. Within Congress Party he was known for his left-leaning. He was elected as the member of policy and programme drafting committee of Congress Socialist Party.

After India's independence he joined Socialist party (India) and became the member of its national executive. In the year of 1952 he became the member of Praja Socialist Party and served as the Joint Secretary of Praja Socialist Party during 1954–1958. In 1952 at the invitation of Marshal Tito he led a delegation of socialist leaders to Yugoslavia, which included Karpoori Thakur, Banke Bihari Das, Shanti Narayan Naik and Madhu Dandavate.

Faridul Haq along with Asaf Ali made a major contribution for expansion of Congress Party. They initiated mass contact campaign which resulted in many Muslims joining the Congress Party and deserting the membership of Muslim League. After independence Faridul Haq served two terms as the Member of Parliament in Rajya Sabha between 1958 and 1966. He died on 4 April 1966 in Delhi due to coronary thrombosis.

Position held
 Secretary, Delhi Pradesh Congress Committee, 1927
 Secretary, Praja Socialist Party, 1954–58   
 Member of Parliament (Rajya Sabha), 1958–64
 Member of Parliament (Rajya Sabha), 1964–66

References

1895 births
Indian independence activists
Rajya Sabha members from Uttar Pradesh
People from Ghazipur
Quit India Movement
20th-century Indian lawyers
Indian National Congress politicians from Uttar Pradesh
St. Stephen's College, Delhi alumni
Indian independence activists from Uttar Pradesh
Uttar Pradesh politicians
1966 deaths
Indian socialists
Alumni of the University of Oxford
Aligarh Muslim University alumni
Praja Socialist Party politicians
Prisoners and detainees of British India